7th parallel may refer to:

7th parallel north, a circle of latitude in the Northern Hemisphere
7th parallel south, a circle of latitude in the Southern Hemisphere